is a railway station in Nakamura-ku, Nagoya, Aichi Prefecture, Japan.

Lines

 (Station number: H04)

Layout

Platforms

References

External links
 

Railway stations in Japan opened in 1969
Railway stations in Aichi Prefecture